Silene uniflora is a species of flowering plant in the family Caryophyllaceae known by the common name sea campion.

Description
Silene uniflora is a herbaceous perennial plant, similar in appearance to the bladder campion (Silene vulgaris) but with flowers generally solitary. It is generally prostrate, mat-forming. The leaves are linear, grey-green glabrous and glaucous in opposite and decussate pairs, the flowers white with five deeply notched petals, the 5 sepals fused and inflated to form a bladder.

Distribution
Silene uniflora is a maritime species, almost confined to Iceland, the Atlantic and Baltic Sea coasts of western Europe up to the Kola Peninsula in European Russia, and the archipelagos of Madeira and the Azores. In Britain it also occurs rarely in the mountains. It has been introduced to Argentina and New Zealand.

Subspecies
The sea campion has five known subspecies, these are:

S. uniflora subsp. cratericola (Franco) Franco: Native to Mount Pico, Azores
S. uniflora subsp. islandica (Á. Löve & D. Löve): Native to Iceland
S. uniflora subsp. petraea (C. Hartm.) Jonsell & H. C. Prent.
S. uniflora subsp. thorei (Dufour) Jalas: Native to Southwest France (extinct in Spain)
S. uniflora subsp. uniflora: Atlantic Europe, the Azores, Madeira, extinct in the Savage Islands

References

uniflora